The Mahāvastu (Sanskrit for "Great Event" or "Great Story") is a text of the Lokottaravāda school of Early Buddhism.  It describes itself as being a historical preface to the Buddhist monastic codes (vinaya).  Over half of the text is composed of Jātaka and Avadāna tales, accounts of the earlier lives of the Buddha and other bodhisattvas.

The Mahāvastu contains prose and verse written in mixed Sanskrit, Pali and Prakrit. It is believed to have been compiled between the 2nd century BCE and 4th century CE.

Pali Canon parallels
The Mahāvastu's Jātaka tales are similar to those of the Pali Canon although significant differences exist in terms of the tales' details.  Other parts of the Mahāvastu have more direct parallels in the Pali Canon including from the Digha Nikaya (DN 19, Mahāgovinda Sutta), the Majjhima Nikaya (MN 26, Ariyapariyesana Sutta; and, MN 36, Mahasaccaka Sutta), the Khuddakapātha, the Dhammapada (ch. 8, Sahassa Vagga; and, ch. 25, Bhikkhu Vagga), the Sutta Nipata (Sn 1.3, Khaggavisāa Sutta; Sn 3.1, Pabbajjā Sutta; and, Sn 3.2, Padhāna Sutta), the Vimanavatthu and the Buddhavaṃsa.

Mahayana themes
The Mahāvastu is considered a primary source for the notion of a transcendent (lokottara) Buddha, common to all Mahāsāṃghika schools.  According to the Mahāvastu, over the course of many lives, the once-human-born Buddha developed supramundane abilities including: a painless birth conceived without intercourse; no need for sleep, food, medicine or bathing although engaging in such "in conformity with the world"; omniscience; and, the ability to "suppress karma."

English translations
 Jones, J.J. (trans.) (1949–56). The Mahāvastu (3 vols.) in Sacred Books of the Buddhists. London: Luzac & Co. vol. 1, vol. 2, vol. 3

References

Sources
 Jones, J.J. (trans.) (1949–56). The Mahāvastu (3 vols.) in Sacred Books of the Buddhists. London: Luzac & Co. volume1 volume 2  volume 3
 
 
 Ānandajoti Bhikkhu (2007). A Comparative Edition of the Dhammapada. U. of Peradeniya.  Retrieved 25 Nov 2008 from "Ancient Buddhist Texts"
 J.K. Nariman (1923), Literary History of Sanskrit Buddhism, Bombay: Indian Book Depot; pp. 11–18

External links
 J. J. Jones (1949). The Mahavastu (English translation), including footnotes and glossary
A Note on the Mahāvastu by Dr. A. B. Keith, D.C.L., D.Litt.
A Summary of the Mahāvastu by B.C. Law
 

Early Buddhist texts
Jataka tales